Anasaitis is a genus of jumping spiders that was first described by E. B. Bryant in 1950. The name is derived from the salticid genus Saitis.

Species
 it contains twenty-one species and one subspecies, found in the Caribbean, the United States, Colombia, and Panama:
Anasaitis adorabilis Zhang & Maddison, 2012 – Hispaniola
Anasaitis arcuata (Franganillo, 1930) – Cuba
Anasaitis a. fulgida Franganillo, 1930 – Cuba
Anasaitis banksi (Roewer, 1951) – Hispaniola, Puerto Rico
Anasaitis brunnea Zhang & Maddison, 2012 – Hispaniola
Anasaitis canalis (Chamberlin, 1925) – Panama, Colombia
Anasaitis canosa (Walckenaer, 1837) – USA, Cuba
Anasaitis cubana (Roewer, 1951) – Cuba
Anasaitis decoris Bryant, 1950 – Jamaica
Anasaitis elegantissima (Simon, 1888) – Hispaniola
Anasaitis emertoni (Bryant, 1940) – Cuba
Anasaitis gloriae (Petrunkevitch, 1930) – Puerto Rico
Anasaitis hebetata Zhang & Maddison, 2012 – Hispaniola
Anasaitis laxa Zhang & Maddison, 2012 – Hispaniola
Anasaitis locuples (Simon, 1888) – Hispaniola
Anasaitis morgani (Peckham & Peckham, 1901) (type) – Jamaica, Hispaniola
Anasaitis peckhami (Petrunkevitch, 1914) – Dominican Rep.
Anasaitis perplexa (Peckham & Peckham, 1901) – Jamaica, Hispaniola
Anasaitis placida (Bryant, 1947) – Puerto Rico (Mona Is.)
Anasaitis scintilla Bryant, 1950 – Jamaica
Anasaitis squamata (Bryant, 1940) – Cuba
Anasaitis venatoria (Peckham & Peckham, 1901) – Jamaica

References

Salticidae genera
Salticidae
Spiders of the Caribbean
Spiders of the United States
Arthropods of the Dominican Republic